Xu Xingchu (7 January 1934 – 1 January 2022) was a Chinese engineer and an academician of the Chinese Academy of Sciences. He was a member of the 7th, 8th and 9th National Committees of the Chinese People's Political Consultative Conference.

Biography 
Xu was born in Tianjin, on 7 January 1934. He secondary studied at Nanchang No. 1 High School. In 1951, he was accepted to Dalian University of Technology, majoring in machine tools. After university, he was despatched to the Design Office of the Second Bureau of the Ministry of Machinery Industry (now Beijing Machine Tool Research Institute) as an engineer. He died in Beijing on 1 January 2022, at the age of 87.

Honours and awards 
 1993 Member of the Chinese Academy of Sciences

References 

1934 births
2022 deaths
People from Nanchang
Engineers from Jiangxi
Dalian University of Technology alumni
Members of the Chinese Academy of Sciences
Members of the 7th Chinese People's Political Consultative Conference
Members of the 8th Chinese People's Political Consultative Conference
Members of the 9th Chinese People's Political Consultative Conference